DRK may refer to:

The German Red Cross, or Deutsches Rotes Kreuz
Drake Bay Airport (IATA code: DRK), Drake Bay, Costa Rica
Dash (cryptocurrency), whose previous name (Darkcoin) had the symbol "DRK"
DRK (car), produced from 1987 to 1998
North Korea, UNDP code